Methional is an organic compound with the formula CH3SCH2CH2CHO.  It is a colorless liquid that is a degradation product of methionine. It is a notable flavor in potato-based snacks, namely potato chips, one of the most popular foods containing methional. Traces of the compound can also be found in black tea and green tea based products. Methional contains both aldehyde and thioether functional groups. It is readily soluble in alcohol solvents, including propylene glycol and dipropylene glycol.

Occurrence 
In nature, methional is a thermally-induced volatile flavor compound. For instance, the heat-initiated Maillard reaction of reducing sugars and amino acids forms the initial basis of methional's composition. The formation of methional stems from the interaction of α-dicarbonyl compounds (intermediate products in the Maillard reaction) with methionine (Met) by the Strecker degradation reaction:

CH3SCH2CH2(NH2)CHCO2H  +  O   →   CH3SCH2CH2(HN=)CCO2H  +  H2O

CH3SCH2CH2(HN=)CCO2H + H2O   →   CH3SCH2CH2CHO  +  NH3  +  CO2

Methional easily degrades into methanethiol, which then oxidizes into dimethyl disulfide. Dimethyl disulfide is partly responsible for the "reactive sulfur" that contributes to the taste of potatoes. Furthermore, the methionine resulting from the Strecker degradation reaction produces alkyl pyrazines, which contribute to the flavors in roasted, toasted, or thermally processed foods. Due to the ease of its decomposition, a large portion of methional is lost during potato processing.

Similarly, in the presence of flavin mononucleotide (FMN) and light, methionine is nonenzymatically oxidized into methional, ammonia, and carbon dioxide.

CH3SCH2CH2(NH2)CHCO2H   →   CH3SCH2CH2CHO  +  NH3  +  CO2

Preparation and reactions
Methional is synthesized commercially by the reaction of methanethiol and acrolein.
CH3SH  +  CH2=CHCHO → CH3SCH2CH2CHO

Using the Strecker synthesis, methional is converted to methionine.  For the purpose of animal feed supplements, enantiopure methionine is not required.

Methional is a versatile reagent in organic chemistry.

Biological routes 
Because of their high cost, methional or its precursor methionine are not added during potato processing. In order to intensify flavoring of heat-processed potato foods, biotechnological approaches are used to increase methionine levels, and thus methional levels, in potato foods.

The enzyme aminotransferase acts on methionine to remove the amine and form an α-keto-γ-methylthiobutyric acid. As catalyzed by α-keto acid decarboxylase, this ketomethylthiobutyric acid converts to methional.
CH3S(CH2)2CH(NH2)CO2H  + O   →   CH3S(CH2)2COCO2H  +  NH3
CH3S(CH2)2COCO2H   →   CH3S(CH2)2CHO  +  CO2

References

Thioethers
Flavors
Aldehydes